Brandon Oneal Williams, (born November 30, 1987), better known by his stage name Urban Mystic, is an American recording artist from Fort Lauderdale, Florida, United States. He is best known for his hit singles, "Where Were You" and "I Refuse". Mystic inked a record deal with indie label SoBe Entertainment and released his debut album Ghetto Revelations in 2004.

His second album Ghetto Revelations II was released in 2006. His third album GRIII: Old School 2 Nu Skool was released in 2009. His fourth album Ghetto Revelations IV: Love Intervention was released in 2013. His fifth album Soulful Classics was released in 2015.

Early life 
Williams was born the son of a church minister in 1987 in Fort Lauderdale, Florida, where he was also raised. In his early years, he developed an interest for music at his father's church. He attended Dillard High School in Fort Lauderdale where he sang at every pep rally, show and event that was held in order to get noticed. He even performed at the local "Sistrunk Historical Festival" held every year in honor of Dr. James Sistrunk, one of the first African-American Physicians in Broward County, Florida. He was looking forward to pursuing a musical career with support from his brother Christopher. He grew more familiar with the music industry and became active as songwriter and producer.

Career 
In 2003, Williams gave himself the moniker Urban Mystic which reflects both his street mentality and his singing talent. In 2004, Williams entered into a record deal with SoBe Entertainment. His debut album, Ghetto Revelations, released on November 30, 2004, included the Billboard R&B hit single "Where Were You", produced by KayGee. He also had worked with Red Spyda and El DeBarge on the album. The first single from his second album, "It's You", was released in 2005 and featured Paul Wall. In the same year, Williams joined the newfangled Spitkicker collective.

His second studio album, Ghetto Revelations II was released on March 21, 2006 and produced by Scott Storch, KayGee and Terence "Tramp-Baby" Abney. It reached #10 in the Heatseekers albums chart. The second single, "I Refuse", produced by Scott Storch and released in 2006, reached #36 in the Billboard Hot R&B/Hip-Hop Songs chart.

His third studio album, titled GRIII: Old School 2 Nu Skool, was released in April 2009. The album featured a genre mix of Neo soul and Contemporary R&B. His fourth studio album entitled Love Intervention, was released on February 26, 2013 via digital outlets. The first single off the album is called "In the Morning" featuring producer MDMA, it was released for a digital download on February 23, 2010. The second single "Name On It", it was released on April 3, 2012 via iTunes. The third single "I Promise" released on October 9, 2012 on iTunes. Love Intervention was released for physical retailers on April 16, 2013

Mystic released his fifth album Soulful Classics on July 31, 2015. It was preceded by the release of the singles "No Matter How High" and "Feel Good".

Mystic parted ways with SoBe Entertainment in early 2017. and is currently signed to his own label Urban Life Music Group while planning on the release of his upcoming sixth album Underrated.

Discography

Albums

Singles

References

External links
Official site
Urban Mystic on Tygereye Entertainment

American contemporary R&B singers
Living people
Musicians from Fort Lauderdale, Florida
Singers from Florida
21st-century American singers
21st-century American male singers
1987 births